Digby and Sowton railway station is on the Avocet Line in Devon, England.

History
A small station known as Clyst St Mary and Digby Halt was opened by the London and South Western Railway on 1 June 1908 to serve Clyst St Mary and Digby Hospital.  The 120 foot (37 m) long platforms were built from old railway sleepers.  It was closed by the new British Railways on 27 September 1948.

The present Digby and Sowton station, which was constructed at a cost of £700,000, was funded by Devon County Council and Tesco Stores Limited as part of an initiative to reduce traffic congestion in Exeter. Construction began on 9 November 1994 and it opened on 23 May 1995.

The station was operated by Wessex Trains, until 31 March 2006 when First Great Western (renamed Great Western Railway in 2015) took over the franchise.

Facilities 
In 2009, it was included in a two-year scheme to improve local railway stations. Shelter space for passengers was doubled, better surface and lighting was installed, and a new footpath was created. The cycle network connecting stations along the Avocet Line from Exmouth to Exeter, including the Digby and Sowton station, was improved. The station is unstaffed and an automated ticket machine sells tickets for immediate travel. As a result of this, the station is part of a new Penalty Fare Zone, where passengers could be charged a £20 penalty fare if a ticket is not purchased, prior to joining the train.

Location
The station serves the Sowton Industrial Estate via a long foot/cycle path that runs along the railway line and the housing estates around the former Digby Hospital through a step free access bridge, with divided sections for cycles and pedestrians. The station is also a short walk to/from the Sandy Park rugby ground, the home of the Exeter Chiefs.

Passenger volume
There has been considerable growth in passenger usage of Digby & Sowton. During the twelve months ended March 2003, over 120,000 people used the station, and this doubled within five years. In 2009, over 275,000 passengers used the rail station, making it one of the busiest unstaffed railway stations in the area.

The statistics cover twelve month periods that start in April.

Services

References

External links 

Railway stations in Exeter
Railway stations opened by Railtrack
Railway stations in Great Britain opened in 1995
Railway stations served by Great Western Railway
1995 establishments in England
DfT Category F1 stations